WXFL (96.1 FM, "KIX 96") is a country music-formatted radio station based in Florence, Alabama, United States and owned by Big River Broadcasting, a company established by legendary rock and roll music producer Sam Phillips. WXFL serves Florence and the Tennessee Valley with an ERP of 20,500 watts.

This station has held the WXFL call sign since 1990. Television station WFLA-TV in Tampa, Florida held this call sign from 1983 to 1989.

WXFL has a simulcast partner, WLVS-FM, in Clifton, Tennessee, which broadcasts on 106.5 FM. WXFL can also be heard globally through its online audio stream.

Programming

WXFL is the home for the "Mountain Dew NASCAR Update," which covers NASCAR news and talk.

Special programming includes "6 O'Clock Street Party" with David Havens, "Rockin' Country Saturday night" with Havens, and "Sunday Night Country Classics."

Regular programming includes "Big Farley in the Morning," Sherry St. John, M. Fletcher Brown, and David Havens.

WXFL and its sister station, WQLT-FM, are also affiliates of Fox News Radio.

References

External links
WXFL official website

XFL
Florence–Muscle Shoals metropolitan area
Country radio stations in the United States
Radio stations established in 1992
1992 establishments in Alabama